Charlotte Gerstenhöfer (born 17 August 1999) is a German field hockey player, who plays as a forward.

Career

Club hockey
In the German Bundesliga, Gerstenhöfer represents Mannheimer HC.

National teams

Under–21
Charlotte Gerstenhöfer made her debut for the German U–21 team in 2017 during a test series against Malaysia in Köln. Later that year, she represented the team at the EuroHockey Junior Championship in Valencia.

In 2019, she captained the team to a bronze medal at the EuroHockey Junior Championship in Valencia.

Die Danas
Gerstenhöfer debuted for Die Danas in 2019, during a test series against Argentina in Buenos Aires. 

In 2021 she was elevated to the national team, participating in the third season of the FIH Pro League.

Indoor
In 2020, Kurz was a member of the German team at the EuroHockey Indoor Championship in Minsk.

References

External links

1999 births
Living people
German female field hockey players
Mannheimer HC players
Feldhockey Bundesliga (Women's field hockey) players
21st-century German women